Corvin-negyed is a station on the M3 line of the Budapest Metro. The station opened on 31 December 1976 as one of six stations in the initial phase of construction, between Deák Ferenc tér and Nagyvárad tér. From its opening until 2011, the station was named Ferenc körút after its section of the Grand Boulevard. In 2011, the Corvinus Quarter (Corvin-negyed) was established as a residential and commercial redevelopment area. The city renamed the station after the new district as part of several name changes to metro stations that year.

Connections
Tram: 4, 6

References
Budapest City Atlas, Dimap-Szarvas, Budapest, 2011,

External links
Corvin-negyed station on Youtube

M3 (Budapest Metro) stations
Railway stations opened in 1976